Niagara Purple Eagles basketball may refer to either of the basketball teams that represent Niagara University:
Niagara Purple Eagles men's basketball
Niagara Purple Eagles women's basketball